Sathyakala is an Indian actress in South Indian movies. She was a prominent lead actress during the late 1970s and 1980s in Malayalam films. She had acted in few Tamil films as well. Now she is busy with Tamil telefilms and soap operas.

Biography
Sathyakala hails from Tamil Nadu. She made her Malayalam debut in 1980 with Shalini Ente Koottukari, which was a great success at the box office. She had managed to get a handful of Malayalam movies after that. She had acted as heroine to actors like Mammootty in Saravarsham (1982) and Amritageetham (1982), with Mohanlal in Kaliyamardhanam (1982) and Uyarangalil (1984), with Prem Nazir in Akrosham (1982) and Kari Puranda Jeevithangal (1980). She left the film field in the year 1984 and is settled in Chennai.

Partial filmography

Malayalam

 Bharya Oru Manthri (1986)
 Aattuvanchi Ulanjappol (1984)... Ammini
 Unaroo (1984)... Ammini
 Ningalil Oru Sthree (1984)
 Jeevitham (1984)... Nabeesu
 Krishna Guruvaayoorappa (1984)
 Ente Kalithozhan (1984)
 NH 47 (1984)... Elsy
 Vanitha Police (1984)
 Amme Naaraayana (1984)... Rajeshwari
 Ente Nandinikuttikku (1984)
 Raajavembaala (1984)... Nalini
 Poomadhathe Pennu (1984)... Susheela
 Makale Maappu Tharoo (1984)... Sarada 
 Uyarangalil (1984)... Devi 
 Snehabandham (1983)
 Maniyara (1983)... Sheeja 
 Prasnam Gurutharam (1983)... Sr. Annamma Kuriakose
 Thalaam Thettiya Thaarattu (1983)
 Ee Yugam (1983)... Prema
 Vaashi (1983)
 Ee Vazhi Maathram (1983)... Geetha
 Gurudakshina (1983)
 Ahankaaram (1983)
 Kuyilinethedi (1983)... Parvathy
 Changatham (1983)... Usha
 Justice Raja (1983)... Raji
 Belt Mathai (1983)... Cicily
 Postmortem (1982)
 Amrithageetham (1982)... Geetha
 Saravarsham (1982)... Sumathi 
 Aakrosham (1982)... Geetha 
 Kaaliyamarddanam (1982)... Geetha
 Aa Divasam (1982)
 Oru Thira Pinneyum Thira (1982)
 Rakthasakashi (1982)
 Kattupothu (1982)
 Ivan Oru Simham ... Usha
 Ithaa Oru Dhikkaari (1981)
 Kochu Kochu Thettukal (1980)... Latha
 Karipuranda Jeevithangal (1980)... Daisy
 Pappu (1980)
 Shalini Ente Koottukari (1980)

Tamil
 Iyumbathilum Aasai Varum (1991) 
 Varavu Nalla Uravu (1990)
 Enga Veetu Deivam (1989) 
 Vidhi (1984)
 Veetuku Oru Kannagi (1984)
 Pillaiyar (1984)
 Niraparaadhi (1984)
 Sattam (1983)
 Thanikattu Raja (1982)
 Theerpugal Thiruththapadalam (1982)
 Vidiyum Varai Kaathiru (1981)
 Lorry Driver Rajakannu (1981) 
 Vaadagai Veedu (1981)
 Nenjil Oru Mull (1981)
 Porkkaalam (1980)
 Thunive Thozhan (1980)  
 Thanimaram (1980)
 Karunthel Kannayiram (1972)

Kannada
I Love You (1979)

Hindi
 Mahashakti (1980)

References

External links

 Sathyakala at MSI

Actresses in Malayalam cinema
Indian film actresses
Actresses from Chennai
Actresses in Tamil cinema
Living people
Year of birth missing (living people)
20th-century Indian actresses
Actresses in Kannada cinema
Actresses in Hindi cinema